The 2019 Open BNP Paribas Banque de Bretagne was a professional tennis tournament played on hard courts. It was the ninth edition of the tournament which was part of the 2019 ATP Challenger Tour. It took place in Quimper, France between 28 January and 3 February 2019.

Singles main-draw entrants

Seeds

1 Rankings as of 14 January 2019.

Other entrants
The following players received wildcards into the singles main draw:
  Constantin Bittoun Kouzmine
  Antoine Cornut Chauvinc
  Steve Darcis
  Evan Furness
  Hugo Gaston

The following players received entry into the singles main draw using their ITF World Tennis Ranking:
  Javier Barranco Cosano
  Raúl Brancaccio
  Aslan Karatsev
  Roman Safiullin

The following players received entry into the singles main draw as alternates:
  Hugo Nys
  Fabrizio Ornago

The following players received entry from the qualifying draw:
  Manuel Guinard
  Grégoire Jacq

The following player received entry as a lucky loser:
  Quentin Gueydan

Champions

Singles

 Grégoire Barrère def.  Dan Evans 4–6, 6–2, 6–3.

Doubles

 Fabrice Martin /  Hugo Nys def.  David Pel /  Antonio Šančić 6–4, 6–2.

External links
Official Website

2019 ATP Challenger Tour
2019
2019 in French tennis
January 2019 sports events in France
February 2019 sports events in France